The XIII (Royal Württemberg) Army Corps / XIII AK was a corps of the Imperial German Army. It was, effectively, also the army of the Kingdom of Württemberg, which had been integrated in 1871 into the Prussian Army command structure, as had the armies of most German states. The corps was originally established as the Württemberg Corps Command (Korpskommando) in 1817. It became the XIII Army Corps when it was integrated into the Prussian numbering system on December 18, 1871, shortly after the Franco-Prussian War.

Austro-Prussian War 
The corps saw action in the 1866 Austro-Prussian War, on the losing Austrian side, as the Royal Württemberg Division of the VIII German Federation Army Corps (VIII. deutschen Bundesarmeekorps). It was unable to stop a Prussian advance into north Württemberg at Tauberbischofsheim, but this battle was not important in the war.

Franco-Prussian War 
In the Franco-Prussian War of 1870-71, the corps served under the headquarters staff of the Württemberg Field Division of the Combined Württemberg-Baden Army Corps. The Württemberg Field Division saw action in the battles of Wörth and Sedan, and in the Siege of Paris.

Peacetime organisation 
The corps' two divisions were the 26th and 27th.

The 25 peacetime Corps of the German Army (Guards, I - XXI, I - III Bavarian) had a reasonably standardised organisation. Each consisted of two divisions with usually two infantry brigades, one field artillery brigade and a cavalry brigade each. Each brigade normally consisted of two regiments of the appropriate type, so each Corps normally commanded 8 infantry, 4 field artillery and 4 cavalry regiments. There were exceptions to this rule:
V, VI, VII, IX and XIV Corps each had a 5th infantry brigade (so 10 infantry regiments)
II, XIII, XVIII and XXI Corps had a 9th infantry regiment
I, VI and XVI Corps had a 3rd cavalry brigade (so 6 cavalry regiments)
the Guards Corps had 11 infantry regiments (in 5 brigades) and 8 cavalry regiments (in 4 brigades).
Each Corps also directly controlled a number of other units. This could include one or more 
Foot Artillery Regiment
Jäger Battalion
Pioneer Battalion
Train Battalion

In addition, the 126th (8th Württemberg) Infantry "Grand Duke Frederick of Baden" was stationed at Straßburg as part of XV Corps.

World War I

Organisation on mobilisation 
On mobilization on August 2, 1914 the Corps was restructured. The 180th Infantry Regiment was assigned to the 26th Reserve Division in XIV Reserve Corps. The 26th Cavalry Brigade was withdrawn to form part of the 7th Cavalry Division and the 27th Cavalry Brigade was broken up and its regiments assigned as reconnaissance units to the divisions. The two divisions received engineer companies and other support units from the Corps headquarters. In summary, XIII Corps mobilised with 24 infantry battalions, 8 machine gun companies (48 machine guns), 8 cavalry squadrons, 24 field artillery batteries (144 guns), 4 heavy artillery batteries (16 guns), 3 pioneer companies and an aviation detachment.

Combat chronicle 
On mobilization in 1914, the corps was subordinated to the 5th Army and saw action on the Western Front. It was transferred to the 6th Army during the Race to the Sea. In October 1914, the corps headquarters formed Corps Fabeck, which by the end of the month had become a provisional army group, commanding XV Corps, II Bavarian Corps and Corps Urach. In November, the XIII Army Corps was transferred from the 6th Army to the 9th Army on the Eastern Front. By 1916, the corps had returned to the Western Front and was subordinated to the 4th Army under Army Group Crown Prince Rupprecht. From April 1917 to March 1918, the corps commanded Group Caudry, another provisional command. In September 1918, it took over command of Group Ebene under Army Group Duke Albrecht of Württemberg, and commanded Group Ebene until war's end.

It was still in existence at the end of the war in Armee-Abteilung C, Heeresgruppe Gallwitz on the Western Front.

Württemberg mountain battalion 
In 1915, drafts from the Württemberg line regiments were used to form a Württemberg mountain battalion, which became a part of the Alpenkorps division in 1917. This was the unit in which the young Erwin Rommel distinguished himself on the Romanian and Italian fronts, winning the Pour le Mérite (Imperial German equivalent of the Victoria Cross) at the Battle of the Isonzo in 1917.

Commanders 
The XIII Corps had the following commanders during its existence:

See also 

Army of Württemberg
German Army order of battle (1914)
German Army order of battle, Western Front (1918)
History of Württemberg
List of Imperial German infantry regiments
List of Imperial German artillery regiments
List of Imperial German cavalry regiments

References

Bibliography 
 Claus von Bredow, bearb., Historische Rang- und Stammliste des deutschen Heeres (1905)
 Rommel, E. Infanterie Greift An, Voggenreiter, Potsdam 1937
 
 
 
 
 
 

Corps of Germany in World War I
Military of Württemberg
1817 establishments in Germany
1919 disestablishments in Germany
Military units and formations established in 1817
Military units and formations disestablished in 1919
19th-century establishments in Württemberg